East Park Historic District is a national historic district located at Greenville, South Carolina. It encompasses 121 contributing buildings, 1 contributing site, and 3 contributing structures in a middle- / upper-class neighborhood of Greenville.  The houses date from about 1908 to 1950, and include Neoclassical, Colonial Revival, Tudor Revival, Victorian, American Foursquare, Prairie Style, and bungalow styles.

It was added to the National Register of Historic Places in 2005.

References

Houses on the National Register of Historic Places in South Carolina
Historic districts on the National Register of Historic Places in South Carolina
Victorian architecture in South Carolina
Neoclassical architecture in South Carolina
Colonial Revival architecture in South Carolina
Tudor Revival architecture in South Carolina
Houses in Greenville, South Carolina
National Register of Historic Places in Greenville, South Carolina
Historic districts in Greenville County, South Carolina